Khalifa Al-Hitmi (born 20 February 1960) is a Qatari sailor. He competed in the 1996 Summer Olympics.

References

1960 births
Living people
Sailors at the 1996 Summer Olympics – Laser
Olympic sailors of Qatar
Qatari male sailors (sport)